John Dickenson may refer to:

John Dickenson (author) (c. 1570–1636), English author
John Dickenson (Canadian politician) (1847–1932)
John Calhoun Dickenson (1815–1890), Virginia planter and politician
John W. Dickenson (born 1934), Australian inventor

See also
John Dickinson (disambiguation)